The Otrøelva river is a small river in Innlandet, Norway, that originates from headwaters in the Filefjell mountains to Lake Vangsmjøse. It is a part of the Begna river watershed, joining the Begna above Lake Vangsmjøse.

External links
 Otrøelva river discussion

Rivers of Innlandet